Tegostoma aridalis is a moth in the family Crambidae. It was described by Wolfram Mey in 2011. It is found in Namibia and South Africa.

References

Odontiini
Moths described in 2011
Moths of Africa